Counsellors of State are senior members of the British royal family to whom the monarch can delegate and revoke royal functions through letters patent under the Great Seal, to prevent delay or difficulty in the dispatch of public business in the case of their illness (except total incapacity) or of their intended or actual absence from the United Kingdom.

Counsellors of state may carry out "such of the royal functions as may be specified in the Letters Patent". In practice, this means most of the monarch's official duties, such as attending Privy Council meetings, signing routine documents and receiving the credentials of new ambassadors to the Court of St James's. However, by law, counsellors of state cannot grant ranks, titles or peerages. They also, by the terms of the letters patent, cannot deal with a number of core constitutional functions, such as Commonwealth matters, the dissolution of Parliament (except on the monarch's express instruction) and the appointment of prime ministers. A rare example occurred on 7 February 1974 of the Proclamation of the Dissolution of Parliament being promulgated by Queen Elizabeth The Queen Mother and Princess Margaret as counsellors of state, on the express instructions of Queen Elizabeth II.

Royal functions are to be exercised jointly by the counsellors of state or by such number of them as is specified in the letters patent under the Great Seal and subject to any other conditions within. However, there is a legal presumption that counsellors of state should act jointly and, as such, at least two are needed to act, with the absence of one possibly risking a legal challenge.

Counsellors of state are always the monarch's spouse and the next four people in the line of succession who meet the following specifications: they must be British subjects of full age (21 years, or 18 years for the heir apparent or presumptive) who are domiciled in the United Kingdom and not disqualified from becoming monarch. During a regency, the next four eligible people in the line of succession after the regent (and the regent's spouse) may be counsellors. A monarch may also request to add specific people to their counsellors of state. This was done by Queen Elizabeth II in 1953 and King Charles III in 2022.

History
The first counsellors of state were created in 1911 by an Order in Council of George V, and this process was repeated on each occasion of the King's absence or incapacity.

A rule for all future reigns, however, was established by the Regency Act 1937.

Since the passage of the Regency Act 1937, the only persons to have been counsellors of state while not a queen consort, prince, or princess were George Lascelles, 7th Earl of Harewood; Alastair Windsor, 2nd Duke of Connaught and Strathearn (although Windsor had been a prince between 1914 and 1917 and never served in practice during his short tenure); and Maud Carnegie, Countess of Southesk (who was entitled to the style of princess but did not use it). Prior to that, the Lord Chancellor, the Lord President of the Council, the prime minister, and the Archbishop of Canterbury had been appointed to the position by George V.

Queen Elizabeth The Queen Mother lost her eligibility to be a counsellor of state in 1952 upon the death of her husband, King George VI. Section 3 of the Regency Act 1953, however, restored her position. The provision was specific to her, rather than applying to dowager consorts generally, and became spent upon her death in 2002.

Counsellors of state were last appointed for the 2022 State Opening of Parliament.

In September 2022, The Daily Telegraph reported that King Charles III wanted the law to be amended to allow only working members of the royal family to serve as counsellors of state. This would take away the eligibility of family members that do not carry out official functions, while creating a possibility for spouses to senior ranking members and those with a lower position in the line of succession to be called upon and fulfil the role.

Questions were raised in the House of Lords in October 2022 by Lord Stansgate about the "suitability" of having the Duke of York and Duke of Sussex as counsellors of state when the former had "left public life" and the latter had "left the country". It was subsequently reported that, instead of removing the dukes from the list of counsellors of state, it was being proposed that the pool of counsellors be expanded in order to create a more flexible list of available royals to stand in for the king if needed. On 14 November 2022, the King sent a message to both Houses of Parliament, formally asking for a change in the law that would allow Princess Anne and Prince Edward to be added to the list of counsellors of state. The next day, a bill to that end was introduced in Parliament and it received royal assent on 6 December, coming into force on 7 December as the Counsellors of State Act 2022.

List of current counsellors of state
As of 7 December 2022, those eligible to be appointed counsellors of state to Charles III are:

Of these seven, Prince Andrew and Prince Harry do not perform royal duties. If Prince Harry ceases to be domiciled in the United Kingdom, he shall become ineligible to be a counsellor of state. In February 2022 however, Prince Harry renewed his lease on Frogmore Cottage in the UK, meaning he may have intended to continue to be domiciled there. In March 2023, it was confirmed that Prince Harry had been asked to vacate Frogmore Cottage by May 2023.

Prince Andrew remains eligible to serve after withdrawing from most royal activities; this provoked backlash due to the allegations of sexual abuse made against him.

Should any of the above, other than the Queen Consort, the Duke of Edinburgh or the Princess Royal, become ineligible or unable to serve, the next persons eligible would be Princess Eugenie and then Peter Phillips until 8 November 2024 when Lady Louise Mountbatten-Windsor turns 21. Prince George will also automatically become a counsellor of state on his 21st birthday (in 2034) and will replace Princess Beatrice. Prince George will also be eligible at age 18 if his father is king.

List of former counsellors of state

The following is a list of all the people who were once eligible to be a counsellor of state, listed in chronological order:

Timeline

Footnote

References

Bibliography 
Velde, François R. (2004). Regency Acts 1937 to 1953. Retrieved 2005.

External links
 Counsellors of State – The Royal Family's website
 

British monarchy